The following lists events that happened during 2006 in Botswana.

Incumbents
 President: Festus Mogae 
 Vice President: Ian Khama

Events

December
 December 13 - The High Court of Botswana rules that thousands of Bushmen should not have been evicted from their ancestral home which is now the Central Botswana Game Reserve.

References

 
Years of the 21st century in Botswana
2000s in Botswana
Botswana
Botswana